Outeiro de Rei is a town located in the Spanish province of Lugo.

External links 
Outeiro de Rei page at Diputación Provincial de Lugo
Outeiro de Rei page in Galician Wikipedia

Municipalities in the Province of Lugo